Action in the North Atlantic, also known as Heroes Without Uniforms, is a 1943 American black-and-white war film from Warner Bros. Pictures, produced by Jerry Wald, directed by Lloyd Bacon, that stars Humphrey Bogart and Raymond Massey as officers in the U.S. Merchant Marine during World War II. Typical of other films in the era, Action in the North Atlantic was created as a morale-boosting film during this world war and a film that told the story of unsung heroes. As noted by film critic Bosley Crowther, "... it's a good thing to have a picture which waves the flag for the merchant marine. Those boys are going through hell-and-high-water, as 'Action in the North Atlantic' shows."

Plot
An American oil tanker, the SS Northern Star, commanded by Captain Steve Jarvis, is sunk in the North Atlantic Ocean by a German U-boat. Along with First Officer Joe Rossi, Jarvis boards a lifeboat with other crewmen, which is rammed and sunk by the U-boat that torpedoed their ship. The survivors are finally rescued after 11 days adrift on a balsa wood life raft.

During their brief liberty, Steve spends time with his wife Sarah, while Joe meets and marries singer Pearl O'Neill. At the maritime union hall, the Northern Star survivors await assignment to a new ship, which turns out to be a brand new Liberty ship, the SS Seawitch, commanded by Jarvis, with Rossi once again his First Officer.

The Seawitch, armed with anti-aircraft guns manned by trained Navy gunnery personnel, embarks with a convoy carrying vital war supplies to the Soviet port of Murmansk. However, the convoy is forced to disperse when a wolfpack of U-boats torpedoes them one by one. The Seawitch, now on her own, takes successful evasive action, hiding out at the edge of the Arctic icepack to evade a U-boat hunting her—the same U-boat that sank the Northern Star.

After the U-boat breaks off the search, Seawitch lights her boilers off again and heads for Murmansk. The Luftwaffe is called in to try and find the ship. The German maritime patrol planes locate Seawitch and attack with bombs and machine guns. In the ensuing action, Captain Jarvis is seriously wounded, and eight members of the crew and the Armed Guard force are killed. It is up to First Officer Rossi and the surviving members of the Seawitch's crew to get her to port. The fliers had reported locating the Liberty ship, and the U-boat returns to try and sink her. The submarine hits the ship with one torpedo, but Rossi fools the submarine captain into surfacing to finish off the wounded Liberty with his deck gun by setting smoky fires on deck. The Seawitch, listing and damaged, maneuvers and rams the U-boat, sinking it with all hands.

Fires out but still holed, the damaged Liberty continues to Murmansk, wondering if they can make it – which they do, thanks to a squadron of Russian fighters escorting them in. In the end, Joe Rossi, looking at what's left of the convoy in port, worries about the challenges that await them on their return trip.

The movie ends with an excerpt from a speech by President Franklin Delano Roosevelt, paying tribute to the courage and valor of America's Merchant Mariners and the important contribution they are making to the war effort.

Cast
 Humphrey Bogart as First Officer Joe Rossi
 Raymond Massey as Captain Steve Jarvis
 Alan Hale, Sr. as Alfred "Boats" O'Hara
 Julie Bishop as Pearl O'Neill
 Ruth Gordon as Sarah Jarvis
 Sam Levene as Abel "Chips" Abrams
 Dane Clark as Johnnie Pulaski
 Peter Whitney as Whitey Lara
 Dick Hogan as Cadet Ezra Parker

Uncredited roles

 Charles Trowbridge as Rear Admiral Hartridge 
 J. M. Kerrigan as Caviar Jinks
 Kane Richmond as Ensign Wright
 Wilhelm von Brincken as German Sub Captain
 Chick Chandler as Goldberg
 George Offerman, Jr. as Cecil
 Don Douglas as Lieutenant Commander
 Art Foster as Pete Larson
 Ray Montgomery as Aherne
 Glenn Strange as Tex Mathews
 Creighton Hale as Sparks
 Elliott Sullivan as Hennessy
 Alec Craig as McGonigle
 Ludwig Stössel as Captain Ziemer
 Dick Wessel as Cherub
 Frank Puglia as Captain Carpolis
 Iris Adrian as Jenny O'Hara
 Irving Bacon as Bartender
 James Flavin as Lieutenant Commander
 William Hopper as Canadian Soldier
 Louis V. Arco as German Submarine Commander

Production
Warner Brothers' working title for the film was Heroes Without Uniforms, intended to be a two-reel documentary about the Merchant Marine. As the war continued, much combat action footage became available and the project was changed to a feature film with Edward G. Robinson and George Raft initially cast in the starring roles. Technical adviser Richard Sullivan was a 23-year-old Merchant Marine cadet who survived the sinking of his ship by a U-boat.

Eventually Robinson had to drop out to do Destroyer at Columbia and was replaced by Raymond Massey. Raft was put into Background to Danger and was replaced by Humphrey Bogart.

Because war restrictions did not permit filming at sea, the film was shot entirely on Warner Brothers studio sound stages and back lots. According to Bill Collins Presents the Golden Years of Hollywood, the ships sets were built in halves on two sound stages, with the tanker sinking sequence shot first on the studio's "Stage Nine".

Director Lloyd Bacon's contract with Warner Brothers expired during production. Jack L. Warner wanted to wait until the film was finished before entering discussions about a new contract, but Bacon was not willing to continue without one. Warner fired him and brought in Byron Haskin and Raoul Walsh to complete filming, which ran 45 days over schedule.

An anecdote about Action in the North Atlantic claims Bogart and Massey, off-duty and somewhat intoxicated, were watching their stunt men performing a dive off a burning ship.  The two actors started making bets on which stunt man was braver, and eventually the stars themselves made the dive.

Authentic models of German and Soviet aircraft were used in the film, and all dialogue involving non-Americans was in the native tongue of the speaker, without subtitles, both rarities in films of this era.

The journalist Helen Lawrenson was paid compensation by Warners because dialogue was plagiarised from articles she had written about U.S Merchant Mariners ("Damn the Torpedoes", Harpers, July 1942, and "They Keep 'Em Sailing", Colliers, 8 August 1942).

Reception
When Action in the North Atlantic was premiered in New York City, more than a dozen Merchant Mariners and several hundred U.S. sailors presented Jack Warner with the Merchant Marine Victory Flag. Henry J. Kaiser, the ship-building magnate, thought the film was such a morale booster that he wanted it shown to all his employees.

According to a news item in The Hollywood Reporter on June 24, 1943, copies of Action in the North Atlantic were provided to the Merchant Marine schools for use in training when the War Shipping Administration judged that technical and educational material in the film  would "aid considerably the training program". The studio donated three prints for official use at the U.S. Merchant Marine Academy in Kings Point, New York, at cadet basic schools in San Mateo, California, and Pass Christian, Mississippi.

Film critic Bosley Crowther reviewed the film for The New York Times, stating, "... tingling, informative picture which thoroughly lives up to its tag of "Action in the North Atlantic' ... some excellent performances help to hold the film together all the way. Raymond Massey and Humphrey Bogart are good and tough as the captain and first mate ..."

In a one-hour Lux Radio Theatre broadcast on May 15, 1944, Raymond Massey and Julie Bishop reprised their roles while George Raft co-starred, replacing Bogart.

Box office
According to Warner Bros records, the film earned $2,144,000 domestically and $1,316,000 abroad.

Awards and honors
Action in the North Atlantic received an Academy Award nomination for Best Writing (Best Original Story) for Guy Gilpatric.

References

Notes

Bibliography

 Higham, Charles and Joel Greenberg, Hollywood in the Forties. London: A. Zwemmer Limited, 1968. .
Morella, Edward and Edward Z. Epstein and John Griggs. The Films of World War II. Secaucus, New Jersey: The Citadel Press, 1973. .
 Schatz, Thomas. Boom and Bust: American Cinema in the 1940s. Berkeley, California: University of California Press, 1999. . 
 Walker, John ed. Halliwell's Film Guide (10th edition). New York: Harper Collins, 1994. .

External links
 
 
 
 
 
 

1943 films
1940s war drama films
American black-and-white films
American war drama films
American World War II propaganda films
Films directed by Lloyd Bacon
Films directed by Byron Haskin
Films scored by Adolph Deutsch
Warner Bros. films
World War II naval films
1943 drama films
World War II films made in wartime
1940s English-language films